The 2018 1. deild karla (English: Men's First Division) is the 64th season of second-tier Icelandic football. Twelve teams contest in the league. The season began on 5 May and will conclude on 22 September.

Teams
The league is contested by twelve clubs. Eight remained in the division from the 2017 season, while four new clubs joined the 1. deild karla:
 Víkingur Ó. and ÍA were relegated from the 2017 Úrvalsdeild, replacing Fylkir and Keflavík who were promoted to the 2018 Úrvalsdeild.
 Njarðvík and Magni were promoted from the 2017 2. deild karla, in place of Leiknir F. and Grótta who were relegated to the 2018 2. deild karla.

Club information

Managerial changes

League table

Results grid
Each team plays every opponent once home and away for a total of 22 matches per club, and 132 matches altogether.

Top goalscorers

References

External links
 Fixtures at ksí.is

1. deild karla (football) seasons
Iceland
Iceland
2